Good News is a 1980 novel by Edward Abbey. Good News is Abbey's only work of science fiction and can be considered a distant sequel to The Brave Cowboy.

Summary 
It is set in a Phoenix, Arizona of the near future after the economy and government have collapsed. Small bands of people (including Jack Burns, previously from The Brave Cowboy) are trying to live freely, but a would-be military dictator has other plans and is trying to set up a dictatorship using Phoenix as his base.

Publication history 
The book was first published in October 1980 with 242 pages and later reissued in January 1991 with 256 pages by Plume.

References 

Novels by Edward Abbey
1980 American novels
1980 science fiction novels
Dystopian novels
Novels set in Phoenix, Arizona
E. P. Dutton books